The Engin Principal du Génie is an armoured engineering vehicle built upon the chassis of the Leclerc battle tank.

It succeeds the Engin Blindé du Génie.

External links 
 GIAT
 chars-francais.net

Armoured fighting vehicles of France
Military engineering vehicles